The Head of the Republic of Crimea is the highest official and the head of the executive power of the Republic of Crimea; an internationally disputed federal subject of the Russian Federation located on the Crimean Peninsula.

Crimean Head's policy is to ensure compliance with the Constitution and federal laws and the Constitution and laws of the Republic of Crimea, as well as the equality of nations and the rights and freedoms of man and citizen, and the preservation of the coordinated functioning of state bodies of the Republic. Person under 30 cannot be a head of the Republic.

Term of office is five years. Appointed by the State Council of the Republic on nomination of President of the Russian Federation. Interim Head of the Republic is appointed directly by President.

The current Head of the Republic Sergey Aksyonov was elected in 2014 and re-elected in 2019.

History

Background 

The Crimean Peninsula, historically part of Imperial Russia and later an Autonomous Soviet Socialist Republic, was ceded in 1954 to Ukraine, which administered it until the political-military crisis of 2014.

Ukrainian President of Crimea 

Under Ukrainian rule, an equivalent post, named President of the Republic of Crimea, was provided by the 1992 Constitution of the Autonomous Republic of Crimea (de facto a special statute), with jurisdiction over the autonomous city of Sevastopol too. The first presidential elections took place in 1994, won by the pro-Russian separatist Yuriy Meshkov (leader of a coalition named "Russia"), but on 17 March 1995 the Ukrainian parliament, as part of a wider process of reduction of the Crimean autonomy, abolished both the statute and the post of President of Crimea.

From Ukraine to the Russian Federation 

In the aftermath of the 2014 Ukrainian revolution led by pro-European nationalists hostile to Russia, the rise of pro-Russian protests in Ukraine led to the so-called Crimean crisis, parallel to the outbreak of the war in Donbass.
On 6 March 2014, the authorities of the autonomous republic of Crimea, emulated the next day by the authorities of Sevastopol, unilaterally declared independence from Ukraine, formalizing it jointly with a request to join the Russian Federation on March 11.
On March 17, following a joint status referendum held on March 16, the Supreme Council of Crimea and Sevastopol City Council confirmed the independence of the newly unified Republic of Crimea from Ukraine and the popular will to join Russia.
On the same day, Russia recognized the Republic of Crimea as a sovereign state.

On March 18, the Crimean authorities finally signed the accession treaty to the Russian Federation, thus forming the Crimean Federal District, subsequently merged into the Southern Federal District.

On April 11, the State Council of the Republic of Crimea consequently ratified a new constitution, providing for the post of Head of the Republic of Crimea, effective from April 14 of the same year.

Eligibility and authorities 
Under article 62 of the Constitution of the Republic of Crimea, approved by the State Council on 11 April 2014 and entered into force the following day, any Russian citizen who has reached the age of thirty can take up the post, provided that he has not been subjected to restrictions on civil and political rights.

Formally a head of state, the head of the republic is actually a governor, subordinate to the president of the Russian Federation; he oversees the executive, and has the right to legislative initiative in the State Council, which he can also convene exceptionally.

Furthermore, under articles 61-65 of the Constitution, he:
 appoints and dismisses, with the consent of the State Council, the Chairman of the Council of Ministers, without prejudice to the possibility of simultaneously holding both posts, as well as the ministers and other senior officials of the Republic;
 represents the Republic of Crimea in relations with the central government and other local authorities of the Russian Federation, as well as with foreign economic representatives; and signs treaties in the name of the Republic;
 signs and promulgates the laws of the Republic of Crimea; and adopts presidential decrees.

Presidential appointed officials 
 Prosecutor General: Natalia Poklonskaya, appointed by Sergey Aksyonov on 11 March 2014 (although the right of appointment has passed to the Prosecutor General of the Russian Federation, her mandate was confirmed ad interim on March 25 and definitively on 2 May 2014 by Yury Chaika, ending on 6 October 2016);
 Representative to the Federation Council: Olga Kovitidi, appointed by Sergey Aksyonov on 15 April 2014;
 Prime Minister: Yury Gotsanyuk, appointed by Sergey Aksyonov on 20 September 2019.

List

Elections

2014 
Three candidates were nominated for the election:

Sergey Aksyonov, interim Head of the Republic; 
Gennady Naraev, Minister of Ecology and Natural Resources of Crimea;
Alexander Terentyev, Deputy of the State Duma.

2019 

Three candidates were nominated for the election:

Sergey Aksyonov, incumbent Head of the Republic;
Pavel Shperov, Deputy of the State Duma;
Sergey Bogatyrenko, Deputy of the State Council of Crimea.

Notes

References

External links 
 
 2014 Constitution of the Republic of Crimea 
 

Politics of Crimea
Crimea